General elections were held in the Bahamas in 1935. This was the last entirely public ballot elections in the country.

Elected MPs

1935
1935 elections in the Caribbean
1935 in the Bahamas
1935